Suhlendorf is a municipality in the district of Uelzen, in Lower Saxony, Germany. It includes the villages of Batensen, Dallahn, Dalldorf, Groß Ellenberg, Klein Ellenberg, Grabau, Güstau, Kölau, Molbath, Nestau, Növenthien, Rassau, Schlieckau and Wellendorf, as well as Klein Malchau and St. Omer.

References

Municipalities in Lower Saxony
Uelzen (district)